Nakuch (also Romanized as Nakūch; also known as Nowguch) is a village in Negur Rural District, Dashtiari District, Chabahar County, Sistan and Baluchestan Province, Iran. At the 2006 census, its population was 169, in 27 families.

References 

Populated places in Chabahar County